The Coor Crags are several rock crags standing  southeast of Cox Point in the northern part of the Erickson Bluffs, near the coast of Marie Byrd Land. The feature was first observed and photographed from aircraft of the United States Antarctic Service, 1939–41, and mapped by the United States Geological Survey from surveys and from U.S. Navy air photos, 1959–65. The crags were named by the Advisory Committee on Antarctic Names for Lieutenant Commander Lawrence W. Coor, U.S. Navy, pilot of LC-130 Hercules aircraft during Operation Deep Freeze 1970 and 1971.

References 

Cliffs of Marie Byrd Land